Anton Regh (12 September 1940 – 14 January 2018) was a German former footballer who played as a defender for 1. FC Köln and Fortuna Köln. He died on 14 January 2018 at the age of 77.

Honours
 German football championship: 1962
 Bundesliga: 1963–64
 DFB-Pokal: 1967–68

References

External links
 

1940 births
2018 deaths
German footballers
Association football defenders
1. FC Köln players
SC Fortuna Köln players
Bundesliga players
People from Euskirchen
Sportspeople from Cologne (region)